Barry Lategan (born 1935) is a South Africa-born British fashion and portrait photographer, best known for his discovery of, and early work with, Twiggy.

Lategan was born in 1935 in South Africa, and came to the UK to study at the Bristol Old Vic Theatre School. 

He has photographed Princess Anne, Paul McCartney, Linda McCartney, Iman, Germaine Greer, Calvin Klein, Margaret Thatcher, Sol Campbell, John Major, and Salman Rushdie.

As of 2015, Lategan has "evolving dementia".
His photography has been exhibited by the Victoria and Albert Museum, The National Portrait Gallery, the Olympus Gallery, the Royal Photographic Society, Bath, and the South African National Gallery.

References

1935 births
Living people
Photographers from Bristol
Fashion photographers
South African emigrants to the United Kingdom